Brigitte Gyr-Gschwend (born 9 August 1964) is a Swiss former cyclist. She competed in the women's individual road race at the 1988 Summer Olympics.

References

External links
 

1964 births
Living people
Swiss female cyclists
Olympic cyclists of Switzerland
Cyclists at the 1988 Summer Olympics
Place of birth missing (living people)